The Henn, later Hene Baronetcy, of Winkfield in the County of Berkshire, was a title in the Baronetage of England.  It was created on 1 October 1642 for Henry Henn.  The second and subsequent Baronets used the surname Hene.  The title became extinct on the death of the fourth Baronet.

Henn, later Hene baronets, of Winkfield (1642)
Sir Henry Henn, 1st Baronet (c. 1577 – c. 1668)
Sir Henry Hene, 2nd Baronet (c. 1632 – c. 1675)
Sir Henry Hene, 3rd Baronet (1651–1705)
Sir Richard Hene, 4th Baronet (c. 1675 – c. 1710)

References

Extinct baronetcies in the Baronetage of England
1642 establishments in England